A. Soundarapandian is an Indian politician and incumbent member of the Tamil Nadu Legislative Assembly from the Lalgudi constituency. As a cadre of Dravida Munnetra Kazhagam party, he represented the same Lalgudi constituency in 2006 2011 2016 2021 elections.

References 

Dravida Munnetra Kazhagam politicians
Living people
Year of birth missing (living people)
Tamil Nadu MLAs 2006–2011
Tamil Nadu MLAs 2011–2016
Tamil Nadu MLAs 2016–2021
Tamil Nadu MLAs 2021–2026